, also titled The Crucified Woman or The Woman of the Rumor, is a 1954 Japanese drama film directed by Kenji Mizoguchi.

Plot
Widow Hatsuko maintains a successful tayū (highest class of courtesans) house in Kyoto. She is having a discreet affair with young doctor Matoba, who works for the courtesan guild and looks after her. One day, her daughter Yukiko returns from Tokyo following a suicide attempt. Yukiko immediately despises Matoba, while he begins to harbor feelings for the young woman.

Matoba wants to open his own medical practice and is considering a move to Tokyo. Hatsuko does not want him to leave her and implores him to stay. Meanwhile Yukiko deals with the shame of her mother's profession, as it was because of her boyfriend's family discovery of Hatsuko's background that he left her and Yukiko attempted suicide. Hatsuko is concerned when she hears of this, but remains in her chosen profession, as it has paid their way.

As time passes, Yukiko helps out at the courtesan house, and begins to feel compassion for the women who work there, seeing how their circumstances affect their choice to work at the establishment. Also, her feelings towards Matoba have changed, which leads to a confrontation between mother and daughter. When Yukiko finds out that Matoba speculated on money by Hatsuko for his practice, she ends their relationship, instead following in her mother's footsteps as proprietress of the tayū house.

Cast
 Kinuyo Tanaka as Hatsuko Mabuchi
 Tomoemon Otani as Kenji Matoba
 Yoshiko Kuga as Yukiko Mabuchi
 Eitarō Shindō as Yasuichi Harada
 Bontaro Miyake as Kobayashi

References

External links
 

1954 films
Japanese black-and-white films
Films directed by Kenji Mizoguchi
1950s Japanese-language films
Daiei Film films
1954 drama films
Japanese drama films
1950s Japanese films